The Planetario de Montevideo (or Montevideo Planetarium; also known as the Surveyor Germán Barbato Municipal Planetarium), is a planetarium in Montevideo, Uruguay. 

Inaugurated on 11 February 1955, it was the first planetarium in Latin America and all of the southern hemisphere. It has a 18.3 m diameter dome and seats 157 people.

Historically, it used a Spitz Model B projector, which in 2016 was the oldest such projector still in working order. The planetarium was renovated in 2017–19, when the Spitz projector was replaced by a digital system; it reopened in December 2019.

References

External link
Website

Planetaria
Museums in Montevideo